Biratnagar is a metropolitan city in Nepal, which serves as the capital of Koshi Pradesh. With a population of 242,548 as per the 2011 census, it is the largest city in the province and also the headquarters of Morang district. As per the preliminary report of 2021 Nepal census, Biratnagar has an estimated city population of 244,750. It is one of the cities of the Greater Birat Development Area which incorporates the cities of Biratnagar-Itahari-Gothgau-Biratchowk-Dharan primarily located on the Koshi Highway in Eastern Nepal, with an estimated total urban agglomerated population of 804,300 people living in 159,332 households.

Biratnagar was declared a metropolitan city on 22 May 2017, a merger with additional wards pushing the total population to over 240,000. It is the sixth most populous city of Nepal after Kathmandu, Pokhara, Bharatpur, Lalitpur and Birgunj, with 244,750 inhabitants living in 45,204 households as per 2021 Nepal census. It is the most densely populated city among all cities out of the Kathmandu Valley.

The city is home to the Biratnagar Jute Mills, the first large-scale industry of Nepal. Besides being considered as the industrial capital of Nepal, the city has contributed actively to the Nepalese democracy movement by being the birthplace of five prime ministers of democratic Nepal. The latter claim is also evident from the fact that the first labor strike leading to the anti-Rana movement started from Biratnagar.

Modern-day Biratnagar serves as an entry point to eastern Nepal as well as north-eastern India. It is the second Nepalese city, after Janakpur, to have a connection with the Indian Railways and the only city other than Birgunj to operate an integrated check post (ICP) on the Indian border.

History
In 1914, Colonel Jit Bahadur Khatri, the then district governor, laid the foundations of modern Biratnagar by moving the hospital, post office, prison and the customs, land registry, forestry and auditor offices to Gograha Bazaar from Rangeli, the then district capital of Morang.

Recorded history of Biratnagar dates back to beginning of the 7th century, when King Mung Mawrong Hang came to prominence in the terai lands of Limbuwan (present-day Sunsari, Morang and Jhapa area). He cleared much of the forest area in present-day Rangeli, east of Biratnagar, and built a town there. He named his Kingdom Morang after his name and rose to power.

The old name of Biratnagar was Gograha Bazaar. The ruins of temples, palaces and ponds are scattered in a vast area to the south of the current city, in Vedhyari, Buddhanagar. The preservation of this heritage has been a major problem citing the encroachment by newcomers into the city.

The town was named Biratnagar in 1919 (1976 BS) by Keshar Shamsher Rana after the ruins of a palace, thought to be of King Virat (not proved), and other objects of historical importance were found. Kingdom of Virata mentioned  in Mahabharata is however believed to be Viratnagar, located in present-day Rajasthan. King Virata was the king of the Matsya Kingdom, in whose court the Pandavas spent a year in concealment during their exile. According to the Markandeya Purana, the famous seven Kirata kingdoms during the Mahabharat time were Aswakut or Kabul, Kulya or Kulu Valley, Matsya or North Bihar Paundra or Bengal, Sumer or Assam, Malak or Mlek or Lohit, Kinner Kirat or Garhwal and Nepal. In those days, the Kirat people were ruling all the lands from Himalayan Mountains to the sea shores of the Bay of Bengal.

The name may have been derived to refer to as a huge city. In Nepali, Birat means "Huge" and Nagar means "City".

On 4 March 1947, the first anti-Rana movement in Nepal started in Biratnagar at the Biratnagar jute mills under the leadership of Girija Prasad Koirala and B. P. Koirala. This sparked a countrywide anti-Rana demonstration that eventually led to the abolishment of Rana rule in Nepal.

Climate

Demography

Languages 

According to 2011 CBS census data, 39% of the population in the city spoke Nepali, 38% Maithili, 5% Urdu, 2% Rajastani, and 15% spoke other languages as their first language.

Ethnic groups 

Biratnagar is very diverse city, The largest ethnic group is Madheshi consisting of (Brahmins, Yadavs and Baisyas like Teli, Suri, Haluwai, Rauniyars, Kalwars etc.), who make 31% of the population. Second largest ethnic groups is Khas consisting (Hill Brahmin, Chhetri, kami, sarki, damai, thakuri, sanyasi/dasnami) make 30% of the population, similarly Muslim population is (8%). Other groups in Biratnagar include the Newar (5%), Kewat (4%), Marwari (2%) and others various ethnic groups like Tharus, Rajbanshis, Janjatis, Dalits etc. makes 20% of the population.

Transport

Air: Biratnagar Airport serves as a regional hub for the eastern part of the country. A subtotal of 10 flights per day are operated to Kathmandu which makes it the busiest domestic airport in the country after Pokhara. Frequent flights are also operated to Tumlingtar as well as other airports within the country.

It is also well connected to all the parts of Province No. 1 including Dharan, Itahari and Dhankuta as well as to most parts of the country through regular bus service.

 Trains: There are direct trains from the Indian cities of Katihar, Kolkata and New Delhi to the border town of Jogbani. The rail line ends in Jogbani, Araria district on the Indian side. The crossing has a customs checkpoint for goods called as Rani Bhansar. Indian and Nepalese nationals cross the border freely. A monorail extension to Biratnagar has been proposed and surveyed. As of 1 August 2019, the provincial government of Province No. 1 plans to establish a monorail system running 30 km (19 mi) from Rani, Biratnagar to Itahari at an estimated budget of Rs. 30 billion.
 Intracity: Cycle, motor vehicles, rickshaws, and taxis serve the city center. Auto rickshaws (Tempos) are available for longer distances outside the center. City safari or electric rickshaws are the most used transportation here, connect all parts of Biratnagar, and are very cheap as well as environmentally friendly.

Economy

Biratnagar is the economic center of eastern Nepal. The first industry of Nepal, the Biratnagar jute mills, was established here. Biratnagar is driven by startup culture. The multi-million business house, Golchha Organisation, has its roots in Biratnagar where it started as a small startup business. Biratnagar is connected to a major custom route with India and has the second largest land port in Nepal.

Tourism
Biratnagar is a hub for explorers of places in eastern Nepal like Ilam, Taplejung, Sankhuwasabha and Panchthar. A number of colorful haat bazaars (weekly markets) are held each week in different parts of the town, where farmers from the rural hinterland set up stalls to trade agricultural products, spices and handicrafts. There are several gardens, temples and places of religious importance in Biratnagar. Gopal garden, located near Hathkhola and Hridreyandra Bal Udhhyan near Thulo Mill are two main gardens. Temples have been the jewel of Biratnagar. They are decorated in vibrant ways to make them attractive.

These places are famous for Taltalaiya, Ocean Park, Gokulam Resort, Dantakali Temple, Pindeshwor Temple, Budha Subba Temple and Panch Kanya. The hill-station of Bhedetar is a local viewpoint. The tea gardens of Ilam are approximately 4 hours' drive away. Another place of interest is the hilly district of Dhankuta with its orange orchards. The Koshi Tappu Wildlife Reserve, popular with bird-watching enthusiasts, is a 90-minute drive from the city. It is home to the endangered wild buffaloes called "Arna" in Nepali. The largest rhododendron forests of Tinjure, Milke and Jaljale can be reached in about 3–4 hours. Treks with views of Mt. Makalu and Kanchenjunga can be started from the small towns of Basantapur or Tumlingtar.

Politics

The district headquarters of Morang were moved to Biratnagar from Rangeli in 1914 by the then district governor, Colonel Jit Bahadur Khatri. The next governor, Shiva Pratap Shumsher Thapa, further developed the town. Krishna Prasad Koirala was the first major political leader based in Biratnagar. His sons Matrika Prasad Koirala and Bishweshwar Prasad Koirala were the prime ministers of Nepal after the fall of the Rana rule. Since then Biratnagar has been a major contributor to Nepali politics, and is the most politically active city in the country. Girija Prasad Koirala, the younger brother of Matrika and BP Koirala, was elected prime minister on four occasions; from 1991 to 1994, 1998 to 1999, 2000 to 2001, and from 2006 to 2008. He also served as the acting Head of State from January 2007 to July 2008. Man Mohan Adhikari, the first communist prime minister of Nepal was also born in Biratnagar. Leaders like Bharat Mohan Adhikari, Shailaja Acharya, Sushil Koirala, Lal Babu Pandit, Amod Prasad Upadhyay and Mahesh Acharya all hail from this city. The 1973 plane hijack, which was to fund the political revolution, took place at the Biratnagar Airport. The hijack plan, masterminded by Girija Prasad Koirala, was executed by Durga Subedi, Nagendra Dhungel and Basant Bhattarai.

Nepali Congress's Nagesh Koirala and CPN UML's Shilpa Nirala Karki are the current Mayor and Deputy Mayor of the metropolitan respectively.

Education
Biratnagar is the center of education in eastern Nepal. Home to the Purbanchal University, Biratnagar has a number of colleges and educational institutes including medical and engineering institutes. There are two medical colleges in Biratnagar, the first one to open was Nobel Medical College Teaching Hospital and second one was Birat Medical College Teaching Hospital.The medium of teaching is English in all the private schools, colleges and universities whereas Nepali is the medium of instruction in government schools up to secondary level. There are more than 80 schools, over 20 colleges and 21 hospitals in Biratnagar, the most after Kathmandu.

Art and literature

Biratnagar has been the ground for many prominent literary personalities like, Bishweshwar Prasad Koirala, Tarini Prasad Koirala, Dev Kumari Thapa, Bal Krishna Pokharel, Parashu Pradhan, Krishna Bhooshan Bal, Suman Pokhrel, Bhola Rijal, Bhuwan Dhungana and others. Some of the prominent books in Nepali literature have emerged from Biratnagar. Landmark books in Nepali poetry, Bholi Basne Bihan by Krishna Bhooshan Bal and Jeevanko Chheubaata by Suman Pokhrel were first published in this city. There is a popular culture of poetry recitation in regular sessions in various locations of Biratnagar.

Biratnagar is the birthplace of the theater group, Aarohan Gurukul. The theater group was founded and registered with District Administration Office, Morang here in Biratnagar in 1982. The group has expanded its activities to Kathmandu and aboard. This theatre group has produced dozens of theatrical plays including Agniko Katha and Yajnaseni and has got them performed across the countries. At present day, Aarohan Gurukul is considered as one of the major places of public attraction in Biratnagar.

Sports

Cricket and association football are the most popular sports in Biratnagar. Biratnagar City F.C. is one of the heart beats of the footballing culture of the city. Sahid Rangsala with a capacity of 10,000+ spectators is the largest football stadium in the city. Sahid Maidan is the home stadium of Morang Football Club. The Mahendra Gold Cup, now Birat Gold Cup, is held in the stadium along with district divisional league matches. There is a covered hall nearby Sahid Maidan where indoor events can be organized. A cricket stadium is being constructed in Baijanathpur on the outskirts of Biratnagar with the objective of organizing local and national-level cricket tournaments. Other facilities in the city include lawn tennis and basketball courts

Television and radio
Makalu TV
Hipamat TV HD
Entertainment online radio
B FM 91.2 MHz
Radio Star 93.2 MHz
Koshi FM 94.3 MHz
Sky FM 106.6 MHz
Radio Makalu 102.1 MHz
Radio Purbanchal FM 104.4 MHz
Radio Purbeli Awaj 98.4

Print and online media
Several local and national daily, weekly and monthly publications are available in the city. Media houses Kantipur, Nagarik, and Aja Ko Samachar Patra print their publications in Biratnagar and distribute throughout eastern Nepal. Local dailies such as Udgosh and Biratpath provide daily news and updates on their websites in addition to their print editions. Local daily newspapers published in Biratnagar include:

 Janacharcha.com
 Our Biratnagar
hamromat.com
 New Shristhi Daily
 Ujyalo Patra Daily
 Udghosh Daily
 Timesofpurba.com
 Biratpath Daily
 Entertainmentkhabar.com
 OnlyKhabar Media
 Hipamat.com
 scriling.com
 newsarticleblog.com
 Birat Sandesh Digital Online

Local Level Election

Local Level Election 2074 
Not available

Local Level Election 2079

Notable residents
 Shiv Kumar Mandal, CPN (Maoist) Center leader, politician

Upendra Yadav, People's Ssocialist Party, Nepal politician
Amod Prasad Upadhyay, Nepali Congress politician
Arunima Lamsal, actress
Bhola Rijal, gynaecologist and poet
Bhola Silwal, footballer
Bharat Mohan Adhikari, CPN (UML) leader
Bishweshwar Prasad Koirala, 22nd Prime Minister of Nepal and a psychoanalytic writer
Deepa Shree Niraula, actress
Girija Prasad Koirala, 30th Prime Minister of Nepal
Lal Babu Pandit, Nepal Communist Party politician
Mahesh Acharya, Nepali Congress politician
Man Mohan Adhikari, 31st Prime Minister of Nepal
Matrika Prasad Koirala, 18th Prime Minister of Nepal
Ranu Devi Adhikari, singer
Shailaja Acharya, Nepali Congress politician
Shekhar Koirala, Nepali Congress politician
Shilpa Maskey, actress
Shiv Shrestha, actor
Siddhant Lohani, cricketer
Sugam Pokharel, singer
Sujata Koirala, Nepali Congress leader
Suman Pokhrel, poet, lyricist, playwright
Sunil Pokhrel, actor
Sushil Koirala, 37th Prime Minister of Nepal
Sushila Koirala; classical dancer, theater director, and wife of Bishweshwar Prasad Koirala
Tarini Prasad Koirala, Nepali Congress leader
Yuvaraj Adhikari, Nepali Congress leader.
Navin poudel CPN Maouist Center Leader

See also

 2022 Biratnagar municipal election

References

External links 

 

 
Cities in Nepal
Metropolitan cities in Nepal
Metropolitan areas of Nepal
Populated places in Morang District
Populated places in Mithila, Nepal
Transit and customs posts along the India–Nepal border
Morang District
Municipalities in Koshi Province
Nepal municipalities established in 1953
Municipalities in Morang District
Nepalese capital cities